MFC Lokomotyv Kharkiv  (ukr. Міні-Футбольний Клуб «Локомотив» Харків), is a futsal club from Kharkiv, Ukraine, and plays in Ukrainian Men's Futsal Championship.

Honours
 Ukrainian Cup:
 2009

See also
 FC Lokomotyv Kharkiv, an association football club

External links 
  Official web site
  UEFA profile

Futsal clubs in Ukraine
Sport in Kharkiv
Railway sports teams
Futsal clubs established in 1991
1991 establishments in Ukraine
Southern Railways (Ukraine)